Rockland is a historic home located on Falls Road in Brooklandville, Baltimore County, Maryland.  It is a -story Greek Revival-influenced house consisting of a three-bay-wide main block, constructed in 1837, with two telescoping additions, a two-bay-wide stage completed in 1852, and a three-bay-wide section built after 1890.  The brick structure has been stuccoed and scored to resemble ashlar masonry. Also on the property are a smokehouse, bake oven, a large bank barn, and a late-19th-century frame shed.

It was listed on the National Register of Historic Places in 1983.

Gallery

References

External links
, including photo from 1982, at Maryland Historical Trust

Brooklandville, Maryland
Houses in Baltimore County, Maryland
Houses on the National Register of Historic Places in Maryland
Greek Revival houses in Maryland
Houses completed in 1837
National Register of Historic Places in Baltimore County, Maryland